Safa'i is a village on the north central coast of Savai'i island in Samoa. The village is part of the electoral constituency (Faipule District) Gaga'emauga 2 which forms part of the larger political district Gaga'emauga.

The population of Safa'i is 2226.

Safa'i is a sub-village pito nu'u of the larger traditional village district of Matautu which includes the villages of Avao, Lelepa, Fagamalo, Saleia and more recently Sato'alepai. All the villages are situated along the coast with the main island road passing through the settlements.

Safa'i is at the east end of Matautu, near the lava fields at Saleaula village. The neighbouring village on its west side is Sato'alepai where there is a conservation area and turtle habitat.

References

Populated places in Gaga'emauga